Enigmina is a genus of armoured harvestmen in the family Phalangodidae. There are at least two described species in Enigmina.

Species
These two species belong to the genus Enigmina:
 Enigmina granita (Briggs, 1968)
 Enigmina warrenorum Ubick & Briggs, 2008

References

Further reading

 
 
 
 
 

Harvestmen
Articles created by Qbugbot